Cimarron National Grassland is a National Grassland located in Morton County, Kansas, United States, with a very small part extending eastward into Stevens County. Cimarron National Grassland is located near Comanche National Grassland which is across the border in Colorado. The grassland is administered by the Forest Service together with the Pike and San Isabel National Forests and the Comanche National Grassland, from common headquarters located in Pueblo, Colorado. There are local ranger district offices in Elkhart, Kansas. The grassland is the largest area of public land in the state of Kansas.

Geography
Vegetation is mostly shortgrass prairie grassland, dominated by sand sagebrush in salty soils. Groves of cottonwood and other trees are found near the river.

High winds are common and further desiccate the soil.

The Cimarron River flows through the grassland. From late summer through winter it is usually dry above ground, yet lush vegetation still grows on the banks. Middle Spring flows year round and beaver dams create pools of water nearby. Point of Rocks, a large rock outcropping overlooking the Cimarron River valley, was an important landmark for travelers heading west on the Cimarron Cutoff, and for modern day ranchers, because many springs exist in the area.

History

The present-day Cimarron National Grassland was the territory of the Comanche and other Indian tribes allied to them. In 1822, William Becknell was the first to traverse the Santa Fe Trail by wagon, pioneering the alternate route called the Cimarron cut-off which passed through the National Grassland. In or near the Grassland, mountain man Jedediah Smith was killed by Comanches in 1831.

In 1879, the Beaty Brothers established Point of Rocks Ranch, the first in the area. Wheat farmers soon moved in and prospered in wet years, but the drought of the 1930s caused the Dust Bowl. Morton County, Kansas was the most devastated county in the nation. The Federal government bought land from bankrupt farmers, restored the original prairie, and in 1960 the Cimarron National Grassland was created. The grassland is dedicated to "water conservation, wildlife management, recreation, cattle grazing, and mineral production." Cattle are grazed and oil and gas wells are found on the Grassland.

In May 2011, there was a substantial wildfire known as the Tunner Fire, which blanketed approximately one half of the park along with several thousands of acres of private prairie and the campground. However, rains in the spring of 2012 brought about a significant turnaround. The land greened up and the park's management reopened many of its sections.

Recreation

Activities include camping, hiking, horseback riding, fishing, hunting, and a car tour.

The grassland includes  of the Santa Fe National Historic Trail. The ruts left by wagon trains are still visible. The Cimarron Recreation area offers tent and trailer camping, picnicking, a group site, and access to the Turkey Trail.

Several fishing ponds, including four at the Cimarron Recreation Area, are stocked with rainbow trout in the winter and channel catfish in the summer. Other sport fish include crappie, sunfish, and largemouth bass.  Animals hunted include whitetail deer, pronghorn, quail, pheasant, prairie dog and jack rabbit.

The Cimarron Grassland has a population of rare lesser prairie chickens and has two viewing areas. The males perform their courting rituals from mid-March until early June. Elk were reintroduced into the Grassland in 1981 and a herd of 50 is maintained. Hunting by special permit is sometimes allowed to thin the herd.

See also
 List of protected grasslands of North America

References

External links 
 
 Cimarron National Grassland, kansastravel.org
 Cimarron National Grassland, naturalkansas.org
 Birds of Cimarron National Grassland, United States Forest Service

Grasslands of the North American Great Plains
Protected areas of Morton County, Kansas
National Grasslands of the United States
Protected areas of Stevens County, Kansas
Protected areas established in 1960
Grasslands of Kansas
1960 establishments in Kansas